Beckett is a surname.

Beckett may also refer to:

Places 
 Beckett, New Jersey, United States, a census-designated place and unincorporated community
 Beckett, Ohio, United States, an unincorporated community
 Beckett, Oklahoma, United States, an unincorporated community
 Beckett (crater),  a crater on Mercury
 Beckett Hall or Beckett House, a 19th-century mansion in Oxfordshire, England
 Beckett Nunatak, Victoria Land, Antarctica, a rock nunatak
 Beckett Park, a residential area and park in Leeds, West Yorkshire, England
 Beckett Point, Washington, United States, a small point

Businesses 
 Beckett Media, an American company focusing on collectibles, especially sports collectibles

Other uses 
 Beckett baronets, two extant titles in the Baronetage of the United Kingdom
 Beckett Bould (1880–1970), British actor
 Beckett (horse), an Irish Thoroughbred racehorse
 Beckett (band), an English hard rock band
 Beckett (film), a 2021 thriller film

See also 
 Becket (disambiguation)